The Cessna 170 is an American light, single-engined, general aviation aircraft produced by the Cessna Aircraft Company between 1948 and 1956.

It is the predecessor of the Cessna 172, the most produced aircraft in history, which replaced the 170 in production in 1956.

Development

170
In late 1948, Cessna began sales of the 170, with a metal fuselage and tail and fabric-covered constant-chord wings. These earliest 170s were  four-seat versions of the popular 140 with a more powerful  Continental C145-2 and an extra interconnected fuel tank in one wing for a total of 36 gallons in three tanks. Like the 140, they were constructed of metal with fabric-covered wings supported by a "V" strut.

170A
In 1949 Cessna began marketing the 170A, an all-metal 170 with zero-dihedral wing tapered outboard of the slightly-enlarged plain flaps with 50 degrees maximum deflection, two 21 gallon fuel tanks, and a single strut replacing the "V" strut of the 170. This and subsequent versions of the 170 shared the fin/rudder shape of the larger Cessna 190 and 195 models.

305
In 1950, the United States Air Force, Army and Marines began using the military variant of the 170, the Model 305, designated the L-19 and later O-1 Bird Dog by the military. It was used as a forward air control and reconnaissance aircraft. The Bird Dog was extensively redesigned from the basic 170 and included a revised tandem-seat fuselage and a wing with large modified Fowler flaps that deployed up to 60°.

170B
In 1952, the Cessna 170B was introduced, featuring a new wing tapered outboard of the flaps, incorporating dihedral similar to the military version. The 170B model also included a new tailplane, a revised tailwheel bracket, and other refinements over the 170 and 170A. It was marketed in 1952 for $7245.

In 1955, the previously elliptical rear side windows were changed to a squarer design.

Experimental
In 1958 Cessna experimented with a belt driven 145 hp Continental engine. The company completed 1000 hours of test flying.  The belt drive reduced vibration, engine noise and propeller noise.  A 92 inch propeller with 70 degrees of pitch improved the rate of climb 12 percent.  The belts used were developed by Goodyear Tire and Rubber Company and were 3/8-inch wide, 7/16-inch deep, and 41 inches long.

Successor
The 170 is equipped with conventional landing gear, which is more challenging to land than tricycle landing gear. In 1956, Cessna introduced a replacement for the 170 that was essentially a nosewheel-equipped 170B with a square tailfin, designated the 172. 170 production was halted soon after the 172 became available.

Model 309 and 319
Between 1951 and 1955 Cessna used modifications of the 170 and its derivative, the U.S. Army L-19, as test beds for Boundary layer control research, under contract to the Office of Naval Research and the Army Transportation Corps, designating them as the models 309 and 319. The project was done in conjunction with the University of Wichita which conducted extensive wind tunnel tests of the concept. The model 309 utilized the German World War II Arado lift-increasing system in which a jet pump inside the wing sucked in stagnant air from the flap area, energized it and blew the higher-speed air over the ailerons. Various chemicals and enhancements were used to power the jet pump. Better results were obtained by departing from the Arado jet pump method and using an engine-driven generator to power electric motors driving axial fans to move the internal air. 

This concept was adopted on the Model 319 but substituted an engine-driven hydraulic pump to drive hydraulic-powered axial fans. This model was more successful and resulted in the highest lift capacity, as measured by the maximum lift coefficient recorded up to that time.
The 309 and 319 were meant to be research aircraft only, and no plans were developed to incorporate boundary layer control technology in then-current Cessna models. Others were also working on the concept, it was incorporated into the Lockheed F-104 Starfighter.

Today
Over 5,000 Cessna 170s were built and over 2,000 are still in service today.

Operators

Military

Dominican Army

Air Force of El Salvador

Guatemalan Air Force

Honduran Air Force

Specifications (170B)

See also

References

Citations

Bibliography
 
 
 
 

170
High-wing aircraft
Single-engined tractor aircraft
1940s United States civil utility aircraft
Aircraft first flown in 1948